No. 77 Squadron RAF was a squadron of the Royal Air Force which was active in various incarnations between 1916 and 1963.

History
No. 77 Squadron was formed on 1 October 1916 at Edinburgh, and was equipped with B.E.2 and B.E.12 aircraft. The squadron disbanded at RAF Turnhouse on 13 June 1919.

The squadron was reformed on 14 June 1937, at RAF Finningley from 'B' Flight of No. 102 Squadron. It operated the Hawker Audax until November 1937, then re-equipped with the Vickers Wellesley. In 1938 the squadron moved to RAF Driffield, to form part of No. 4 Group, and re-equipped with Armstrong Whitworth Whitleys. The squadron joined Coastal Command in May 1942 and was engaged in anti-submarine patrols, based at RAF Chivenor.

In October 1942, the squadron converted to Halifaxes at RAF Elvington, moving to RAF Full Sutton in May 1944. On 8 May 1945 the squadron joined Transport Command, and in July 1945 re-equipped with Douglas Dakotas. The squadron moved to Broadwell in August 1945 followed by a posting to India in October 1945. The squadron was disbanded by being renumbered as No. 31 Squadron on 1 November 1946.

It was reformed at Broadwell in December 1946 when No. 271 Squadron was re-numbered. The squadron operated Dakotas during the Berlin Airlift and then disbanded on 1 June 1949 at RAF Waterbeach.

Strategic missiles
The squadron was again reformed as 77(SM) Sqn. - on 1 September 1958 as one of 20 Strategic Missile (SM) squadrons associated with Project Emily. The squadron was equipped with three PGM-17 Thor Intermediate range ballistic missiles, and based at RAF Feltwell.

In October 1962, during the Cuban Missile Crisis, the squadron was kept at full readiness, with the missiles aimed at strategic targets in the USSR.
The squadron was disbanded on 10 July 1963 with the termination of the Thor Program in Britain.

Aircraft operated
 1916-1918 Royal Aircraft Factory BE2c
 1916-1918 Royal Aircraft Factory BE12
 1916 Airco DH.6
 1916 Royal Aircraft Factory BE2d
 1917-1918 Royal Aircraft Factory BE2e
 1917-1918 Royal Aircraft Factory RE8
 1917-1918 Royal Aircraft Factory BE12b
 1918-1919 Avro 504K (NF)
 1937 Hawker Audax
 1937-1938 Vickers Wellesley
 1938-1939 Armstrong Whitworth Whitley III
 1939-1942 Armstrong Whitworth Whitley V
 1942-1945 Handley Page Halifax II, III, VI and V
 1945-1946 Douglas Dakota
 1946-1949 Douglas Dakota
 1958-1963 PGM-17 Thor IRBM

See also
 List of Thor missile bases

References

Citations

Bibliography

External links

 
 
 

077
077
No. 77
Ballistic missile squadrons of the Royal Air Force